Sir Henry Herbert Juta (12 August 1857 – 16 May 1930) was a South African judge who served as Speaker of the Cape House of Assembly, Judge President of the Cape Provincial Division and judge of the South African Appellate Division.

Early life and education
Juta attended the South African College in Cape Town from 1868 to 1874, where he matriculated with distinction. He obtained a BA degree in 1876 and then went to the University of London, gaining a LLB with honours. He became a member of the Inner Temple in January 1880.

Career
Juta returned to Cape Town and was admitted to the bar on 14 September 1880. He had a busy practice and also served as an examiner for the University of the Cape of Good Hope. In 1892 he served as an acting judge in Griqualand West and in 1893 he entered politics.

He served as MLA for Oudtshoorn from 1893 to 1898, and briefly in 1894, as Attorney General for the second government of Prime Minister Cecil Rhodes. He also took silk in 1893 and in 1896 became speaker of the legislative assembly. He was knighted in the 1897 Diamond Jubilee Honours. In 1899 he became MLA for Port Elizabeth, a constituency he represented until 1907.

In late 1902 he visited the United Kingdom with his family. Juta was appointed Judge President of the Cape Provincial Division in September 1914 and in 1920 he was appointed Judge of the Appeal Court. He resigned in 1923 and settled with his wife in Europe.

Family
Juta was born in South Africa to Jan Carel Juta and Louise Marx and baptised into the Dutch Reformed Church. He was a nephew of Karl Marx. His parents together founded the publishing house Juta and Company. 

In 1883, he married Helen Lena Tait and they had four daughters and one son. The eldest daughter, Helen (1886–1952), married the English composer John David Davis in 1919.

References

1857 births
1930 deaths
Cape Colony politicians
Knights Bachelor
Speakers of the House of Assembly of the Cape Colony
South African judges